September Bowl of Green is an album by The Grapes of Wrath.
The initial vinyl pressing of the album included a cover version of The Beatles song "If I Needed Someone", but at the request of the band, the song was left off of subsequent pressings. This version of the song has never been released again, but the band has included it in some set lists during their 2010 reunion tour. All songs composed by Tom Hooper/Kevin Kane/Chris Hooper.

Track listing
 Misunderstanding (Tom Cochrane Remix)  2:29
 Love Comes Around (Tom Cochrane Remix) 3:31
 Breaks My Heart↑                       5:49
 A Dream (About You)                    3:07
 Didn't You Say Something               4:55 
 And I Know                             4:43
 Self-Abuse                             3:37
 Umbrella                               4:01
 Realistic Birds                        5:30
 See Her Go↑                            3:27
 Lay Out The Trap                       4:27
 Down To The Wire                       4:03
 Laughing Out Loud                      4:11
 Breaks My Heart (Live)                 5:47

↑Tracks on the CD that are omitted on vinyl

Original vinyl track listing
 Misunderstanding (Original Greg Reely Mix)
 Love Comes Around (Original Greg Reely Mix)
 Breaks My Heart
 A Dream (About You)
 Didn't You Say Something
 And I Know
 Self-Abuse
 Umbrella
 If I Needed Someone
 Realistic Birds

1986 albums
The Grapes of Wrath (band) albums
Nettwerk Records albums
Albums produced by Greg Reely